George (Bryanchaninov), Congregation of Marian Fathers (8 June 1919 – 5 April 2018) was a Russian priest in the Russian Greek Catholic Church, an Archimandrite and a member of the Russian apostolate in the Diaspora.

Biography
George Bryanchaninov was born on 8 June 1919 in Blagoveshchensk, Russian Federation. In his Orthodox baptism he was named Gleb. Together with his parents he emigrated to China, where in 1937 he graduated with honors at High School of Saint Nicholas in Harbin. Soon after, he joined the Catholic Church and on 4 December 1938 entered the Marian Order, taking the monastic name George. From May 1939 he received religious education in Rome, hosted a program on Vatican Radio. In 1944 he was ordained a priest of the Russian Catholic Church by Bishop Alexander Evreinov. He obtained a doctoral degree (1947, thesis "Studies of Saint John Chrysostom Church of obedience to authority"). On behalf of General Order Marian Bishop Peter Buchis he was engaged by Russian children in refugee camps in Western Europe. Until 1950 he worked in the Russian Committee for Refugee in the Vatican, then in 1956 he went to London. 

In 1957 he moved to Australia to help Andrei Katkov, his classmate at the Lyceum, and brother in the Order. With him, he co-founded the Missionary Centre for Eastern-rite Catholics in Melbourne, nourished Catholics after moving to Australia from China, as Russian immigrants, including once in 1958, when Fr. Andrew (rink) was recalled to Rome. Father Bryanchaninov received Australian citizenship. In the beginning of 1990 he travelled several times to Russia. Until the end of 2007 he lived in the Center for the Russians of Eastern Rite, then in the house of Saint Joseph Nursing Home for Priests, for elderly priests in Northcote (suburb of Melbourne). Archimandrite George (Bryanchaninov) was nephew of the bishop and theologian Ignatius Bryanchaninov. He died in Melbourne, Victoria, Australia in April 2018 at the age of 98.

References

Vladimir Kolupaev. Catholic mission in China: the Byzantine rite Catholic Diocese in 1928-1949 gg. / / Religious figure and writer RUSSIAN FOREIGN
Vladimir Kolupaev. Byzantine Rite Catholic communities, and the Russian diaspora

External links
 http://zarubezhje.narod.ru/av/b_147.htm
 http://zarubezhje.narod.ru/texts/frrostislav312.htm
 

1919 births
2018 deaths
Converts to Eastern Catholicism from Eastern Orthodoxy
Former Russian Orthodox Christians
People from Blagoveshchensk
Russian Eastern Catholics